Edward Stuart Little II (born January 29, 1947) was elected seventh Bishop of the Episcopal Diocese of Northern Indiana on November 5, 1999, and consecrated on March 18, 2000, in the Basilica of the Sacred Heart on the campus of the University of Notre Dame. He was seated in the Cathedral of St. James, South Bend, on April 30, 2000. He has announced his retirement on June 30, 2016.

Ministry
Bishop Edward S. Little II was born in New York City on January 29, 1947, and attended schools in Manhattan and in Norwalk, Connecticut. He received his bachelor's degree from the University of Southern California in 1968, his Master of Divinity from Seabury-Western Theological Seminary in 1971, and was ordained deacon and priest that year in the Diocese of Chicago. Following his consecration, Bishop Little was awarded an honorary Doctor of Divinity degree by Seabury-Western.

Bishop Little served two parishes as an assistant—St. Matthew's, Evanston, Illinois, and St. Michael's, Anaheim, California—and then moved in 1975 to St. Joseph's Church, Buena Park, California, to become its vicar and later its first rector. In 1986, Bishop Little was called to All Saints Church, Bakersfield, California, where he served as rector until his election to the episcopate. He has authored two books; Ears to Hear and Joy in Disguise.

He is currently a member of Communion Partners, an Episcopalian group which opposed the 77th General Episcopal Convention's decision to authorize the blessing of same-sex marriages in 2012. The measure to allow the blessing of same-sex unions won by a 111–41 vote with 3 abstentions.

Family life
Bishop Little married the former Sylvia Gardner on March 22, 1968, in Palm Desert, California. They met at the University of Southern California in 1964.

References

Sources
 Episcopal Clerical Directory, 2005, revised edition, New York: Church Publishing, p. 547.
 Little, Edward S. (2003). Ears to Hear. 
 Little, Edward S. (2009). Joy In Disguise . 

American Episcopalians
Episcopal bishops of Indiana
Living people
University of Southern California alumni
1947 births
American Episcopal clergy
Converts to Anglicanism from atheism or agnosticism
Episcopal bishops of Northern Indiana